The following highways are numbered 17B:

Canada
Ontario Highway 17B

India
  National Highway 17B (India)

United States
 County Road 17B (Polk County, Florida)
 Nebraska Link 17B
 New York State Route 17B